This is a list of lighthouses in Bosnia and Herzegovina.

Lighthouses

See also
 Lists of lighthouses and lightvessels

References

External links

 

Bosnia and Herzegovina
Lighthouses
Lighthouses